Mainleus is a municipality in the district of Kulmbach in Bavaria in Germany, the site of a post World War II American sector displaced person camp.

Town administrative division

Mainleus is arranged in the following boroughs:

References

Kulmbach (district)